Mittakandala is a village in Pamulapadu mandal, Kurnool district, Andhra Pradesh state in India. This village now falls under Nandikotkur Assembly constituency. Before that it was under Atmakur constituency.

References

Villages in Kurnool district